Gazipur is a district in central Bangladesh, part of the Dhaka Division. It has an area of 1741.53 km2. It is the home district of Tajuddin Ahmad, the first Prime Minister of Bangladesh and has been a prominent centre of battles and movements throughout history. Gazipur is home to the Bishwa Ijtema, the second-largest annual Muslim gathering in the world with over 5 million attendees. There are many facilities available in this district as it contains numerous universities, colleges, the Bangabandhu Sheikh Mujib Safari Park, Bhawal National Park as well as the country's only business park - the Bangabandhu Hi-Tech City.

History
The ancient city of Dholsamudra in present-day Gazipur served as one of the capitals of the Buddhist Pala Empire. In the sixth century, forts were built in Toke and Ekdala which continued to be used as late as the Mughal Period. The area became known as a strategic region with the establishment of more forts such as that of Karnapur, the digging of the Twin Ponds in 1045. Chinashkhania was the capital of the Chandalas and Shishu Pal had his capital in modern-day Sreepur, which the ruins of can still be seen today. Another fort was built in Dardaria in 1200.

During the reign of the Sultan of Bengal Alauddin Husain Shah (1494-1519), an Islamic scholar known as Shaykh Muhammad ibn Yazdan Bakhsh Bengali visited Ekdala where he transcribed Sahih al-Bukhari and gifted it to the Sultan in nearby Sonargaon. The manuscript is currently kept at the Khuda Bakhsh Oriental Library in Bankipore, Patna, Bihar.

The anti-Mughal leader of the Baro-Bhuiyans, Isa Khan, died of natural causes in September 1599. He was buried in the village of Bakhtarpur. During the governorship of Subahdar Mir Jumla II, a bridge was constructed in Tongi.

The British colonials built indigo factories in Raniganj and Barmi. The first armed resistance of the 1971 Bangladesh Liberation War took place in Gazipur on 19 March 1971.

Demographics

According to the 2011 Bangladesh census, Gazipur District had a population of 3,403,912, of which 1,775,310 were males and 1,628,602 were females. Rural population was 2,366,338 (69.52%) while urban population was 1,037,574 (30.48%). Gazipur had a literacy rate of 62.60% for the population 7 years and above: 65.96% for males and 58.12% for females.

At the time of the 2011 census, the district has a population of 3,403,912. 94.02% are Muslims, 5.19% Hindus and 0.70% Christians. Unlike most of Bangladesh, religious minorities are more concentrated in rural areas than urban areas.

Administration

Gazipur District was established in 1984. It has one city corporation, the Gazipur City Corporation, and is divided into the following upazilas:
 Gazipur Sadar Upazila
 Kaliakair Upazila
 Kapasia Upazila
 Sreepur Upazila
 Kaliganj Upazila

Gazipur (town) has 9 Wards and 31 Mahallas. The area of the town is 49.32 km2. The town's population is 123,531; male 52.52%, female 47.48%; density is 2,505 per km2.
 Mayor Of Gazipur City Corporation: Jahangir Alam
 Administrator of Zila Parishod: Akhteruzzaman
 Deputy Commissioner: Nurul Islam

Transport

 Dhaka-Tongi diversion road connects Gazipur with Dhaka.
 Dhaka-Savar-Tangail road connects Gazipur With Savar and Manikgonj.
 There are seven railway stations in the Gazipur district.

Education
There are six universities in Gazipur: Islamic University of Technology, Bangabandhu Sheikh Mujibur Rahman Agricultural University (formerly the Institute of Postgraduate Studies on Agriculture), Dhaka University of Engineering and Technology, Bangladesh Open University, German University Bangladesh,Bangladesh National University, Bangabandhu Sheikh Mujibur Rahman Digital University.

Establishments such as Gazipur Cantonment College,  Islamic University of Technology, Bangladesh Rice Research Institute (BRRI), Bangladesh Agricultural Research Institute (BARI) and others are located here.

There are two masters level colleges in the district: Bhawal Badre Alam Government College and Tongi Government College.

There are 19 degree colleges in the district. Honors level colleges include: Kaliakair Degree College, Jatir Pita Bangabandhu Degree College, Kaligonj Sramik College, Kapasia Degree College (founded in 1965), and Kazi Azim Uddin College.

Notable  secondary and higher secondary schools include Rani Bilashmoni Government Boys' High School  ,Gazipur Cantonment College, Gazipur Government Women's College, Safiuddin Sarker Academy and College, Gazipur Metropolitan College,  M. E. H. Arif College, and Tongi Pilot School & Girls' College.

The madrasa education system includes 26 fazil and 3 kamil madrasas.

Tourist attractions
Gazipur is one of the most popular tourist destinations in Bangladesh. There are several tourist attractions in this area. Most notable are:  
 Bangabandhu Sheikh Mujib Safari Park
 Bhawal National Park
 Nuhash Polli
 Bhadun

Establishments
 ওয়েলফশন মানবকল্যাণ সংঘ (EN- Welftion Human Welfare Association)

Notable people 
 Tajuddin Ahmad, first Prime Minister of Bangladesh
 Afsaruddin Ahmad, lawyer
 M. Zahid Hasan, quantum physician
 Ahsanullah Master, trade union leader
 Hannan Shah, army officer
 Mohammad Sanaullah, physician
 Mohammad Shahidullah, politician
 Abu Jafar Shamsuddin, author
 Mohammad Obaid Ullah, politician
 Zahid Ahsan Russel, politician
 Simeen Hussain Rimi, politician
 Meghnad Saha, astrophysicist and developer of the Saha ionization equation
 Tanjim Ahmad Sohel Taj, former minister, politician and television host
 Zahir Uddin Ahmed, former Chief of Naval Staff, Bangladesh Navy

See also
 Districts of Bangladesh

Notes

References

 
Districts of Bangladesh
Districts and regions of Greater Dhaka